Drumcondra is a railway station on the Dublin Connolly to Longford and Grand Canal Dock to Newbridge commuter services. Almost all Sligo and Longford to Dublin services stop at Drumcondra.

It serves Drumcondra, Dublin, Ireland and is the nearest railway station for Croke Park and Tolka Park sports venues.
It is elevated with just the entrance on the main Drumcondra road.

The ticket office is open from 07:00 AM to 23:30 PM, Monday to Sunday.

Directly outside station is a bus stop with connections to Dublin Airport and Swords (Dublin Bus stop 17).

History
The station initially opened on 1 April 1901, but closed on 1 December 1910, with the termination of Kingsbridge (now Heuston Station) to Amiens Street (now Connolly Station) services. Part of the original building was demolished in late 1918.

It reopened on 2 March 1998 as a station on the Maynooth/Longford commuter line.

Proposals
Drumcondra was considered as a potential interchange stop on the proposed Metro North line of the Dublin Metro. However, following publication of revised plans for MetroLink in 2018, it was proposed that it would link up with a new station at Glasnevin, west of Drumcondra.

See also 
 List of railway stations in Ireland
 Rail transport in Ireland
 St. Anne's Road Pocket Park

References

External links

  Irish Rail Drumcondra Station Website

Drumcondra, Dublin
Iarnród Éireann stations in Dublin (city)
Railway stations opened in 1901